The Mind Masters is a 1983 role-playing game adventure for Gamma World published by TSR.

Plot summary
The Mind Masters is the fourth Gamma World adventure and sends a group of player characters to investigate a great store of artifacts.

Reception
Chris Baylis reviewed The Mind Masters for Imagine magazine, and stated that "The impressive cover, good production and artwork fail to hide this time-wasting scenario TSR have released for the Gamma World game."

Steve Crow reviewed The Mind Masters in Space Gamer No. 70. Crow commented that "While I would recommend this module to any gamemaster looking for new and different ways to challenge his players, I would advise that the gamemaster must be very experienced, as he or she is going to have to fill in the many gaps in the play sequence. The Mind Masters is definitely the best of the Gamma World modules to come out, despite its flaws, but be advised that there are holes that will have to be navigated to get to the good parts."

References

Gamma World
Role-playing game supplements introduced in 1983
Science fiction role-playing game adventures